The following is a list of the 15 cantons of the Tarn-et-Garonne department, in France, following the French canton reorganisation which came into effect in March 2015:

 Aveyron-Lère
 Beaumont-de-Lomagne
 Castelsarrasin
 Garonne-Lomagne-Brulhois
 Moissac
 Montauban-1
 Montauban-2
 Montauban-3
 Montech
 Pays de Serres Sud-Quercy
 Quercy-Aveyron
 Quercy-Rouergue
 Tarn-Tescou-Quercy vert
 Valence
 Verdun-sur-Garonne

References